State Route 313 (SR-313) is a  state highway in San Juan and Grand Counties in the U.S. State of Utah. The highway has been designated the Dead Horse Point Mesa Scenic Byway. The highway is an access road for both the Island in the  Sky district of Canyonlands National Park and Dead Horse Point State Park. The highway is a toll road in Dead Horse Point State Park. Westbound traffic is charged a state park entrance fee at the park boundary.

The route was assigned north of Moab in the 1975 in place of SR-278, a proposed but never constructed access to Dead Horse Point. The original alignment of the highway featured steep grades and blind corners. The highway was completely rebuilt in the  1980s after sustaining damage while crews rebuilt the access road to Canyonlands National Park.

Route description

The highway begins at the overlook in Dead Horse Point State Park's parking lot (22 miles south of Moab). Gaining its scenic byway designation, SR-313 heads northward, along the ridges of Dead Horse Point. Soon after, all drivers exit the park and have to pay a toll. There is an intersection with a local road, and the highway begins to turn to the northwest. The elevation along SR-313 fluctuates for several miles, until intersecting with Long Canyon Road. Long Canyon Road is a connector that heads through Long Canyon and intersects with SR-279. The route continues in a stretch of area known as the Big Flat, where it intersects the entrance to Canyonlands National Park. Soon after the westward turn, SR-313 intersects with Island in the Sky Road, a local road that heads southward from the main highway.

The Knoll, a nearby mountain, is visible as the highway makes a turn to the north. The route has left Dead Horse Point State Park by now, and progresses northward through Grand County. At the intersection with Little Canyon Road, SR-313 turns to the northwest once again. However, this pattern straightens out to a northward one. At Gemini Bridges Road, the route turns to the opposite direction, heading to the northwest. The highway continues along in this direction for some time, passing Mineral Bottom Road, and drops down in elevation. The route turns back to the north, and then northeast, until it makes a hairpin turn in the mountains, entering the South Fork of the Sevenmile Canyon. While traversing the canyon there are several view areas along the highway overlooking both Sevenmile canyon, Dead Horse Point, and two rock formations called the Monitor and Merrimac Butte, both named after warships in the American Civil War.

History

With highways in and near Moab back in the 1960s limited to just two state-maintained highways, there was no state route built to access Dead Horse Point. The only two highways in the area were U.S. Route 160 (now U.S. Route 191) and State Route 128. There were two routes assigned in the direction of Dead Horse Point in the 1960s, SR-278 and SR-279. The route that SR-313 runs along was mapped by 1969, stretching all the way to Dead Horse Point as an unmarked county highway. Though SR-279 was completed in 1962, SR-278 was never constructed. In 1975, the proposal for SR-278 was cancelled. In its place, the Utah Department of Transportation assigned SR-313, assuming maintenance for what was local roads.

The original roadbed featured blind switchbacks and an 11% grade on the descent into Seven Mile canyon. The access road to Canyonlands National Park was rebuilt 1988, and the construction crews severely damaged SR-313 in the process. The highway was completely rebuilt, starting in 1989, to its modern form. The reconstruction reduced the maximum grade from 11% to 8% and re-graded the switchbacks to be on level ground to eliminate the blind corners.

Major intersections

References

External links
Gemini Natural Bridges, scenic attraction near SR 313 at Atlas Obscura

313
313
 313
 313